Baruny (Baruny) is a village in Belarus, not far from the town of Ashmyany. In the 18th and 19th centuries the local Basilian monastery was famous for its school, where many of young local noblemen such as poet Antoni Edward Odyniec and writer Ignacy Chodźko received their primary education. The monastery originally rose into prominence because of the venerated image of Virgin Mary, which is still preserved in the church in our days.

Sources
 Энцыклапедыя гісторыі Беларусі. У 6 т. Т. 1: А — Беліца / Беларус. Энцыкл.; Рэдкал.: М. В. Біч і інш.; Прадм. М. Ткачова; Маст. Э. Э. Жакевіч. — Мн.: БелЭн, 1993. — 494 с., [8] к.: іл.  (in Belarusian)

Populated places in Grodno Region
Vilnius Voivodeship
Oshmyansky Uyezd
Wilno Voivodeship (1926–1939)